The 1952 European Figure Skating Championships were held in Vienna, Austria from February 4 to 6. Elite senior-level figure skaters from European ISU member nations competed for the title of European Champion in the disciplines of men's singles, ladies' singles, and pair skating.

Results

Men

Ladies

Pairs

References

External links
 results

European Figure Skating Championships, 1952
European Figure Skating Championships, 1952
European Figure Skating Championships
International figure skating competitions hosted by Austria
Sports competitions in Vienna
1950s in Vienna
European Figure Skating Championships